Her First Biscuits is a 1909 American silent short comedy film written by Frank E. Woods, directed by D. W. Griffith, and starring John R. Cumpson and Florence Lawrence. At its release in June 1909, the comedy was distributed to theaters on a "split reel", which was a single projection reel that accommodated more than one motion picture. It shared its reel with another Biograph short directed by Griffith, the drama The Faded Lilies. Prints of both films are preserved in the film archive of the Library of Congress.

Cast

John R. Cumpson - Mr. Jones
Florence Lawrence - Mrs. Jones
Linda Arvidson	
Charles Avery - Biscuit Victim
Dorothy Bernard	
Clara T. Bracy	
Charles Craig		
Flora Finch		
Guy Hedlund	
Anita Hendrie - Biscuit Victim
Arthur V. Johnson - Biscuit Victim
Marion Leonard - Biscuit Victim
Jeanie MacPherson - Secretary
Owen Moore: Biscuit Victim
Anthony O'Sullivan: Workman
Mary Pickford: Biscuit Victim

Notes

References

External links
 

1909 comedy films
1909 films
Silent American comedy films
American silent short films
American black-and-white films
Films directed by D. W. Griffith
1909 short films
American comedy short films
1900s American films